Wilhelm von Leslie (originally William Leslie) (1657–1727) was a Scottish Roman Catholic priest, who became Bishop of Laibach in 1718.

Life
He was the second son of William Leslie, fifth laird of Warthill, Aberdeenshire, and his wife Anne, daughter of James Elphinstone of Glack, and great-niece of William Elphinstone, bishop of Aberdeen. He went at the age of 11 with his elder brother to King's College, Aberdeen.

On leaving the university Leslie was for a time parish schoolmaster of Chapel of Garioch, near his father's property. In 1684 he moved to Padua to study. There he became a Roman Catholic convert and after studying for the priesthood at the Pontifical Scots College in Rome took holy orders. Cardinal Gregorio Barbarigo appointed him professor of theology at Padua. On 22 Dec 1697, he was consecrated bishop by Giulio Piazza, Bishop of Faenza, with László Ádám Erdődy, Bishop of Nitra, and Sigismund Kollonitsch, Bishop of Vác, serving as co-consecrators. He held a succession of church posts in Austria and Hungary, and also became a diplomat.

Leslie had relatives in Austria, the Counts Leslie, and through their influence he became in 1716 Bishop of Waitzen in Hungary. In favour with Emperor Joseph I, and a privy councillor, he was in 1718 translated to the see of Laibach, an appointment which carried with it the dignities of metropolitan of Carniola and prince of the Holy Roman Empire.

In 1725 Leslie sent home to Scotland, to his brother, his portrait and his diploma from the university of Padua, with some correspondence. He died in 1727.

Notes

External links
Attribution

1657 births
1727 deaths
Scottish Roman Catholic priests
Roman Catholic bishops of Ljubljana
People from Aberdeenshire
Bishops of Vác